The two-banded warbler (Myiothlypis bivittata) is a species of bird in the family Parulidae. It is found in Argentina, Bolivia, Brazil, Guyana, Peru, and Venezuela.  Its natural habitats are subtropical or tropical moist montane forests and heavily degraded former forest.

References

two-banded warbler
Birds of Venezuela
Birds of the Yungas
two-banded warbler
Taxonomy articles created by Polbot